Quadri  is a comune and town in the province of Chieti in the Abruzzo region of Italy.

Quadri may also refer to:

 Quadri (surname), surname
 Caffè Quadri, coffeehouse located in the Procuratie Vecchie of Piazza San Marco, Venice

See also 

 Qadri (disambiguation)
 Quadro